Shawn Patterson may refer to:

 Shawn Patterson (American football) (born 1964), American former professional football player
 Shawn Patterson (composer) (born 1965), American composer and songwriter